Diprotodontia is an order of Australian marsupial mammals. Members of this order are called diprotodonts. Diprotodontia is the largest order of marsupials and currently comprises 140 extant species, which are grouped into 39 genera. They are found in Australia, New Guinea, and Indonesia in forests, shrublands, grasslands, and savannas, though some species can also be found in deserts and rocky areas. They come in a wide array of sizes, ranging from the Tasmanian pygmy possum, at  plus a  tail, to the red kangaroo, at  plus a  tail.

Diprotodontia is subdivided into three suborders: Macropodiformes, Phalangeriformes, and Vombatiformes. Macropodiformes has 72 species in 3 families: Hypsiprymnodontidae, Macropodidae, and Potoroidae, and includes kangaroos, wallabies, bettongs, potoroos, and rat-kangaroos. Phalangeriformes has 64 species in 6 families: Acrobatidae, Petauridae, Pseudocheiridae, Tarsipedidae, Burramyidae, and Phalangeridae, and includes cuscuses and brushtail, ringtail, and gliding possums. Vombatiformes has only four species in two families: Phascolarctidae, or the koala, and Vombatidae, or the wombats. The organization of the order is not fixed, with many recent proposals made based on molecular phylogenetic analysis; additionally, the present trio of suborders by splitting the former suborder Phalangerida into Macropodiformes and Phalangeriformes based on research beginning in 1997, with further reorganizations proposed.

In addition to the extant species, eight species in the suborder Phalangeriformes—four in the family Macropodidae and four in Potoroidae—have been made extinct in the modern era, all between the 1880s and the 1940s after the colonization of Australia began: the broad-faced potoroo, crescent nail-tail wallaby, desert bettong, desert rat-kangaroo, eastern hare-wallaby, Lake Mackay hare-wallaby, Nullarbor dwarf bettong, and toolache wallaby. Dozens of extinct prehistoric Diprotodont species have also been discovered, though due to ongoing research and discoveries the exact number and categorization is not fixed.

Conventions
Range maps are provided wherever possible; if a range map is not available, a description of the collective range of species in that genera is provided. Ranges are based on the International Union for Conservation of Nature (IUCN) Red List of Threatened Species unless otherwise noted. All extinct genera or species listed alongside extant species went extinct after 1500 CE, and are indicated by a dagger symbol "".

Classification
The order Diprotodontia consists of 140 extant species belonging to 39 genera. This does not include hybrid species or extinct prehistoric species. Modern molecular studies indicate that the 39 genera can be grouped into 11 families; these families are split into the suborders Macropodiformes, Phalangeriformes, and Vombatiformes, and many are further grouped into named clades or subfamilies. In addition to the extant species, eight species in the suborder Phalangeriformes—four in the family Macropodidae and four in Potoroidae, including one extinct genus—have been made extinct in the modern era, all between the 1880s and the 1940s after the colonization of Australia began.

Suborder Macropodiformes
 Family Hypsiprymnodontidae (musky rat-kangaroo): 1 genus, 1 species
 Family Macropodidae
 Subfamily Macropodinae (kangaroos and wallabies) 12 genera, 66 species (4 extinct)
 Subfamily Sthenurinae (banded hare-wallaby) 1 genera, 1 species
 Family Potoroidae (bettongs, potoroos, and rat-kangaroos) 4 genera (1 extinct), 9 species (2 extinct)

Suborder Phalangeriformes
 Superfamily Petauroidea
 Family Acrobatidae (feather-tailed possum and feather-tailed glider): 2 genera, 2 species
 Family Petauridae (possums): 3 genera, 11 species
 Family Pseudocheiridae
 Subfamily Hemibelideinae (greater gliders): 2 genera, 2 species
 Subfamily Pseudocheirinae (ringtail possums): 3 genera, 11 species
 Subfamily Pseudochiropsinae (ringtail possums): 1 genus, 5 species
 Family Tarsipedidae (honey possum): 1 genus, 1 species
 Superfamily Phalangeroidea
 Family Burramyidae (pygmy possums): 2 genera, 5 species
 Family Phalangeridae
 Subfamily Ailuropinae (bear cuscuses): 1 genus, 2 species
 Subfamily Phalangerinae (cuscuses): 5 genera, 25 species

Suborder Vombatiformes
 Family Phascolarctidae (koala): 1 genus, 1 species
 Family Vombatidae (wombats): 2 genera, 3 species

Diprotodonts
The following classification is based on the taxonomy described by Mammal Species of the World (2005), with augmentation by generally accepted proposals made since using molecular phylogenetic analysis, as supported by both the IUCN and the American Society of Mammalogists.

Suborder Macropodiformes

Hypsiprymnodontidae

Macropodidae

Potoroidae

Suborder Phalangeriformes

Superfamily Petauroidea

Acrobatidae

Petauridae

Pseudocheiridae

Tarsipedidae

Superfamily Phalangeroidea

Burramyidae

Phalangeridae

Suborder Vombatiformes

Phascolarctidae

Vombatidae

References

Sources

 
 
 
 
 
 
 
 

Diprotodonts
Diprotodontia
Diprotodontia